Galole Constituency is an electoral constituency in Kenya. It is one of three constituencies in Tana River County. The constituency has eight wards, all electing councillors to the Tana River County Council. The constituency was established for the 1988 elections.

Members of Parliament

Wards

References 

Constituencies in Tana River County
Constituencies in Coast Province
1988 establishments in Kenya
Constituencies established in 1988